Joyrex J9ii is an album by Richard D. James under the alias Caustic Window. The release is a 12" vinyl and has received more than one pressing. The title of this release is very similar to another Caustic Window release titled Joyrex J9i.

All tracks were later re-released on the album Compilation.

A full, slower version of the drone track that can just about be heard in the mix of "The Garden of Linmiri" can be found on the Analogue Bubblebath 3 CD release as track 11.

Pressing discrepancy

First pressing
100 copies were released in a Wilton LP size cardboard mailer, with a photocopied label on the front stating the following:
REPHLEX DISCO ASSAULT KIT (CAT 09-II)
CAUSTIC WINDOW - JOYREX J9 EP
(FIRST 100 CONTAIN EXCLUSIVE T-SHIRTS)
MISSION CONTROL: PO BOX 2676 LONDON N11 1AZ
IN THE EVENT OF A LACK OF DANCEFLOOR STIMULUS
BREAK THIS SEAL. DO NOT HESITATE IN USING THIS
EQUIPMENT TO SECURE ANY SUBVERSIVE CLUB
SITUATION WHERE BACKUP IS UNAVAILABLE.

And on the rear flap:
CAUTION
The manufacturers of this package
will not accept responsibility for
any brain damage, hearing loss
or haemorrhaging resulting from
reception of the recordings within.

This issue contained a blue t-shirt with a yellow Rephlex logo, some 'Magic Gum' candy, and the first issue of J9ii (distinguished from the later issue by the text side of the label simply stating 'the Caustic Window' in orange lettering, as opposed to the later issues more detailed yellow/green text).

Second pressing
A further 900 copies of exactly the same record were also released in Wilton LP size mailers, only this time without any t-shirts, and with some substituting the 'Magic Gum' candy for 'Fizz Wizz' popping candy. These also have a different front label on the mailer, this time stating:
REPHLEX
The Caustic Window - Joyrex J9 EP (CAT 009 ii)
p+c 1993 RePhleX (P.O. BOX 2676, LONDON N11 1AZ)
The label on the rear flap is the same as before.

Third pressing
Finally, the most common copies were released in plain back 12" sleeves without any of these extras, the only difference from the others records is the yellow/green label text (as mentioned before, and probably changed to accommodate the information previously on the mailer labels). Printed circularly around this issues labels edge is the following:
THE CAUSTIC WINDOW JOYREX J9 EP (CAT 009ii)P+C 1993 REPHLEX - PO BOX 2676 LONDON N11 1AZ DISTRIBUTED BY KUDOS 071 328 4442

Track listing

Side A
"Fantasia" – 6:01
"Clayhill Dub" – 3:23

Side B
"The Garden of Linmiri" – 6:08
"We Are the Music Makers (Hardcore Mix)" – 3:59
No track titles appear anywhere on the release; however, proper titles can be found on Compilation.
Track B1 appeared on the compilation Energy '93 (Disco B, db 13) under the name "cat 009 iii".

Aphex Twin EPs
1993 EPs